The Dream Again Tour was a two-leg concert tour by Filipina singer Lea Salonga. The tour was titled after her 2020 single, "Dream Again." It was originally intended to run during 2020 under a different headline, but it was postponed in March 2020, shortly after Salonga's performances in Dubai, due to the onset of the COVID-19 pandemic. In May 2020, the tour was once again postponed to Fall 2021. On September 20, 2021, Salonga announced the United Kingdom (UK) leg of the tour, officially named after the 2020 single. The following month, she announced that she would first be touring the United States and Canada in Spring 2022.

The North American leg of the tour officially began on April 6, 2022, in Winnipeg, Manitoba and ended on May 21, 2022, in Honolulu, Hawaii. After performing at the 2022 National Memorial Day Concert at the West Lawn of the United States Capitol in Washington, D.C., Salonga continued the tour, opening the UK leg on June 18, 2022, in Leicester, England. Salonga concluded the tour on July 1, 2022, in Glasgow, Scotland.

Traveling with her throughout the tour, her four-piece band consisted of Larry Yurman (Music Director/Piano), Paul Viapiano (Guitars), Kevin Axt (Basses), and Ray Brinker (Drums).

Critical reception
The tour received a positive review from Elliot Lanes in BroadwayWorld. While reviewing her performance at the Royal Albert Hall in London, All That Dazzles wrote that "seeing her live is an experience like no other."

Setlist 
This setlist is representative of the show in London, performed on June 28, 2022. It does not represent all concerts for the duration of the tour.

Overture 

 "Lea Salonga Overture"

Act 1 

 "Dream Again"
 "Time After Time / Here You Come Again"
 "Move On / Not While I'm Around"
 "It's Quiet Uptown"
 "For Forever"
 "Photograph"
 "Imagine"
 "Bring Him Home"

Act 2 

 "Waiting for Life"
 "Somewhere"
 "Maybe This Time"
 "Written in Stone"
 "Toxic"
 "Happy Days Are Here Again"
 "Greatest Hits Medley (I'd Give My Life For You / A Whole New World / Reflection / On My Own / I Dreamed a Dream / The Human Heart)"
 "Dynamite"

Encore 

 "How Far I'll Go"
 "Back for Good / MMMBop / Tearin' Up My Heart / I Want It That Way / My Love / What Makes You Beautiful"

Shows

References 

2022 concert tours
Concert tours postponed due to the COVID-19 pandemic